Sanghiya Loktantrik Rastriya Manch is a political party in Nepal. The party is registered with the Election Commission of Nepal ahead of the 2008 Constituent Assembly election. The party was formed through the coming together of 12 different janajati organisations.

The party agitates for the formation of a Limbuwan autonomous region in North-Eastern Nepal. The Sangiya Limbuwan Rajyaparishad is connected to the party. It is the umbrella organization of Federal Limbuwan State Council, Khumbuwan State, Tamagsaling Autonomous State Council, and United Tharu National Front including 13 other ethnic fronts.

The party is a continuent of the Federal Republic National Front.

History 
In the 2017 local elections, the party won seven seats in local governments. The party contested the 2017 legislative and provincial elections. The party did not win any seats in the House of Representatives, but the party won one seat to the Provincial Assembly of Province No. 1 through proportional representation.

Electoral performance

Legislative elections

Provincial elections

Province 1

See also 

 Limbu people
 Limbuwan

References

Socialist parties in Nepal
2007 establishments in Nepal